The men's team modern pentathlon was an event contested at the 1956 Summer Olympics in Melbourne. It was the second appearance of the team modern pentathlon event. The team event used scores from the individual event except that fencing scores were recomputed to account for only team event competitors.

Competition format
The modern pentathlon consisted of five events. The competition dropped the point-for-place system used in previous Games. The 1956 competition introduced a scoring system in which each the results of each event was converted to a score, with a par value of 1,000 in each event, and higher scores were desirable. For the team competition, the scores of the three individual team members were summed.

 Riding: a show jumping competition. The course was 5000 m long, with a time limit of 10 minutes. Riders started with 1000 points; gaining or losing 2.5 points for every second under or over the time limit. They could also lose points through obstacle faults. Negative scores were not possible; the lowest score was 0.
 Fencing: a round-robin, one-touch épée competition. The par score of 1000 points was awarded for winning 75% of the fencer's matches. Each victory above or below that number adjusted the score. 
 Shooting: a rapid fire pistol competition, with 20 shots (each scoring up to 10 points) per competitor. A target score of 195 would give 1000 points; every target point above or below that resulted in a 20-point adjustment.
 Swimming: a 300 m freestyle swimming competition. The par time was 4 minutes, with every second above or below adjusting the score by 5 points.
 Running: a 4 km race. The par time was 15 minutes, with every second above or below adjusting the score by 3 points.

Results

Unadjusted scores from the individual competition are shown with a "*".

References

Modern pentathlon at the 1956 Summer Olympics